The 1st Alpine Division "Taurinense" was a division of the Royal Italian Army during World War II, which specialized in mountain warfare. The Alpini that formed the division are a highly decorated and elite mountain corps of the Italian Army consisting of both infantry and artillery units. Today, the traditions and name of the 1st Alpine Division "Taurinense" are carried on by the Alpine Brigade "Taurinense". The headquarters of the division was in the city of Turin and the majority of its soldiers were drafted from the surrounding Province of Turin — therefore the division was named "Taurinense" for the Roman name of the city of Turin Augusta Taurinorum.

History 
The division's lineage begins with the I Alpine Brigade formed in Turin on 11 March 1926 with the 1st, 2nd, 3rd, and 4th Alpini regiments and the 1st Mountain Artillery Regiment. On 19 October 1933 the brigade was split and the IV Alpine Brigade with the 1st and 2nd Alpini regiments was raised in Cuneo. On 27 October 1934 the brigade changed its name to I Superior Alpine Command, which received the name Taurinense in December of the same year.

On 10 September 1935 the I Superior Alpine Command "Taurinense" was reformed as 1st Alpine Division "Taurinense" with the 3rd and 4th Alpini regiments and the 1st Alpine Artillery Regiment. On 25 December 1935 the Taurinense temporarily transferred its Alpini battalions "Exilles" and "Intra", and two batteries from its alpine artillery regiment to the 5th Alpine Division "Pusteria" for the Second Italo-Ethiopian War.

World War II 
The division participated in the Italian invasion of France in June 1940. On 21-22 June it participated in the attack on the Little St Bernard Pass. At the end of the war the division occupied Bourg-Saint-Maurice-Sainte-Foy.

In January 1942 the division landed in Dubrovnik and moved from there to Mostar in Croatia, where it participated in the third Axis anti-Partisan offensive from 15 April to 31 May. The division captured Trnovo, and also reached and blocked Kalinovik where it made contact with elements of the 22nd Infantry Division "Cacciatori delle Alpi"; but, overall, the offensive was a failure.

In August 1942 the Taurinense moved to Nikšić in Montenegro. A year later the division took part in the fifth Axis anti-Partisan offensive, but did not complete its objectives there either. After the announcement of the Armistice of Cassibile on 8 September 1943 most of the division was captured by German forces near Kotor, while the Alpini Battalion "Ivrea" and Alpine Artillery Group "Aosta" joined the Yugoslav Partisans and formed the Partisan Division "Garibaldi".

Organization 
  1st Alpine Division "Taurinense", in Turin
  3rd Alpini Regiment, in Pinerolo
  Command Company
  Alpini Battalion "Pinerolo"
  Alpini Battalion "Fenestrelle"
  Alpini Battalion "Exilles"
  Alpini Battalion "Susa" (transferred in 1941 to the 6th Alpine Division "Alpi Graie")
  3rd Supply Squad
  23rd Train Section (Logistic Support)
 3rd Medical Section
 Field Hospital
  4th Alpini Regiment, in Aosta
  Command Company
  Alpini Battalion "Ivrea"
  Alpini Battalion "Aosta"
  Alpini Battalion "Intra"
  4th Supply Squad
  24th Train Section (Logistic Support)
 4th Medical Section
 Field Hospital
  1st Alpine Artillery Regiment, in Turin
  Command and Command Unit
  Alpine Artillery Group "Susa" (75/13 mountain guns)
  Alpine Artillery Group "Aosta" (75/13 mountain guns)
  Command Unit
  I Mixed Alpine Engineer Battalion
  Command Platoon
  101st Searchlight Section
  111th Telegraph and Radio Operators Company
  121st Engineer Company
 203rd Transport Section
 305th Medical Section
 105th Supply Section
 411th Carabinieri Section
 412th Carabinieri Section
 200th Field Post Office

Attached for the invasion of France:
 XII CC.NN. Battalion

Attached during operations in Montenegro:
 10th CC.NN. Group
 LIII CC.NN. Battalion
 CLXII CC.NN. Battalion
 CXIV Machine Gun Battalion
 CVI Guardia alla Frontiera Machine Gun Battalion

Military honors 
On 13 January 1945 the President of Italy awarded the Alpine Artillery Group "Aosta" for its conduct after the announcement of the Armistice of Cassibile Italy's highest military honor, the Gold Medal of Military Valour. 

  Alpine Artillery Group "Aosta" on 13 January 1945

Commanding officers 
The division's commanding officers were:

 Generale di Brigata Carlo Vecchiarelli (1935 - 1936)
 Generale di Brigata Luigi Nuvoloni (1936 - 1937)
 Generale di Brigata Paolo Micheletti (1937 - 26 June 1940)
 Colonel Lorenzo Richieri (acting; 27 June - 10 August 1940)
 Generale di Brigata Giovanni Maccario (11 August 1940 - 4 February 1942)
 Colonel Carlo Cigliana (acting, 5 February 1942 - 5 April 1942)
 Generale di Brigata Lorenzo Vivalda (15 April 1942 - 8 September 1943)

References 

Divisions of Italy in World War II
Alpini divisions of Italy
Military units and formations established in 1935
Military units and formations disestablished in 1943
Military units and formations of Italy in Yugoslavia in World War II
1935 establishments in Italy
1943 disestablishments in Italy